Bernt Jansson (born 26 June 1950) is a Swedish speed skater. He competed in the men's 1000 metres event at the 1976 Winter Olympics.

References

External links
 

1950 births
Living people
Swedish male speed skaters
Olympic speed skaters of Sweden
Speed skaters at the 1976 Winter Olympics
People from Lidköping Municipality
Sportspeople from Västra Götaland County
20th-century Swedish people